The 1998 FA Women's Cup Final was the 27th final of the FA Women's Cup, England's primary cup competition for women's football teams. It was the fifth final to be held under the direct control of the Football Association (FA).

Match

Summary

The final ended 3–2 in favour of Arsenal. The final was broadcast on BSkyB.

Match

Summary

Reception
Andy Gray and Richard Keys of Sky Sports are noted for laughing at the skill of women's footballers in the final of the competition.

References

External links
 
 Report at WomensFACup.co.uk

Cup
Women's FA Cup finals
FA Women's Cup Final 1998
FA Women's Cup Final 1998
May 1998 sports events in the United Kingdom
1998 sports events in London